CCS4 can refer to:
 Code Composer Studio version 4, an integrated development environment for embedded systems by Texas Instruments
 TC LID code for Chipman Airport (New Brunswick), Canada